Pablo Albano and David Engel were the defending champions, but did not participate this year.

Sergi Bruguera and Marc Rosset won the title, defeating Per Henricsson and Ola Jonsson 3–6, 6–3, 6–2 in the final.

Seeds

  Marcos Aurelio Gorriz /  Libor Pimek (quarterfinals)
  Luiz Mattar /  Jaime Oncins (quarterfinals, withdrew)
  Vojtěch Flégl /  Goran Prpić (first round)
  Horacio de la Peña /  Diego Nargiso (first round)

Draw

Draw

References
Draw

Doubles